Cottage Grove State Airport or Jim Wright Field ,  is a public airport serving small general aviation aircraft, located one mile (1.6 km) east of the city of Cottage Grove in Lane County, Oregon, USA.

On December 17, 2003 the airfield was named after Jim Wright, a local aviator and businessman who built a reproduction Hughes H-1 Racer.  Wright died in an accident in aircraft on August 4, 2003.

External links
Wright Machine Tools dedication to Jim Wright
NTSB report on Jim Wright Accident

Airports in Lane County, Oregon
Cottage Grove, Oregon